Lundberg v Royal Exchange Assurance Corp [1933] NZLR 605 is a cited case in New Zealand confirming that an offerer can waive the right to communication that a party has accepted their offer.

References

Court of Appeal of New Zealand cases
New Zealand contract case law
1933 in New Zealand law
1933 in case law